Last Foxtrot in Burbank is a 1973 film directed by Charles Band. It is a spoof of Bernardo Bertolucci's Last Tango in Paris.

Cast
 Michael Pataki as Paul (as Michael Loveman)
 Sherry Denton	as 	Jeanne
 Merlouch Drabin		
 I. William Quinn	as Tom
 Sally Marr as Mrs. Kitchenberg
 Simmy Bow	as Marcel
 Richard Band

See also
 List of American films of 1973

External links
 

1973 films
Films directed by Charles Band
1973 comedy films
American comedy films
1973 directorial debut films
1970s English-language films
1970s American films